RFA Ocean Salvor (A492) was a salvage vessel of the Royal Fleet Auxiliary.

ASV Ocean Salvor was handed to Risdon Beazley Ltd. on delivery; they managed this ship and 29 other Admiralty salvage vessels until the end of the war when 25 were handed to the Royal Maritime Auxiliary Service and three returned to the USA; two were war losses. These ships were never prefixed HMS as they were civilian crewed.

External links
 http://www.uboat.net/allies/warships/ship/7714.html

Ships of the Royal Fleet Auxiliary
Ships built on the River Clyde
1943 ships
King Salvor-class salvage vessels